Fritz Koselka (24 July 1905 Graz in Austria Hungary - 1978) was an Austrian screenwriter and writer. He was involved in writing of about 15 films between 1936 and 1952.

He is possibly best known for his writing of the major Austrian film comedy Ungeküsst soll man nicht schlafen gehn released in 1936

Selected filmography
 Land Without Music (1936)
 Anton the Last (1939)
 My Daughter Lives in Vienna (1940)
 Love is Duty Free (1941)
 Irene in Trouble (1953)

Filmography

External links 
 

Film people from Graz
1905 births
1978 deaths
Place of death missing
Austrian male screenwriters
20th-century Austrian screenwriters
20th-century Austrian male writers